Rumo and His Miraculous Adventures is a fantasy novel, written and comically illustrated by German author Walter Moers.

Plot introduction
The events of this novel take place on the fictional continent of Zamonia, which is also featured in Moers' previous novel The 13 Lives of Captain Bluebear. While Rumo is not a prequel to Bluebear, the two do have many parallel events and returning characters such as Volzotan Smyke, Professor Nightingale, and Fredda the Alpine Imp.  There is also a character named Rumo in The 13½ Lives of Captain Bluebear, but this character, briefly seen, is not the protagonist of Rumo and His Miraculous Adventures but rather a different Wolperting using the same name. This epic consists of two separate sections, with both sections together telling the tale of how Rumo the Wolperting became Zamonia's most illustrious hero.

Plot summary

The first book chronicles Rumo's childhood, beginning with his puppyhood raised by Hackonian Dwarves, his capture and lengthy detainment by fearsome Demonocles on a floating island known as Roaming Rock, and his befriending fellow prisoner Volzotan Smyke.  Smyke, a Shark Grub, gives him the name Rumo (also the name of one of Zamonia's most popular card games) and teaches him to speak, watching him grow into a Wolperting - a strong canine creature with small horns, high intelligence and unparalleled proficiency in combat. With Smyke's tactical ability and Rumo's strength and agility they are able to escape Roaming Rock but eventually decide to go their separate ways.  While Smyke remains an important character, most of the remainder of the first book details Rumo's search for the source of the Silver Thread, a particular scent he visualizes as a thin silver ribbon. The Thread leads him to a city  aptly named Wolperting, full of Wolpertings and intensely guarded. Rumo discovers the source of his Silver Thread - a beautiful female Wolperting named Rala. During his time in Wolperting Rumo attends school to learn swordsmanship and receives his first sword, a small, two-pronged, talking Demonic Sword. Desperately in love with Rala but incredibly bad at showing it, Rumo leaves Wolperting to make a token to gain her favor but upon his return, he discovers an empty city and an entrance to the Netherworld. Scenting the Silver Thread, Rumo descends into the dark to rescue the others.

The second book describes Rumo's journey to Netherworld/Hel—a kingdom ruled by Gornab the Ninety-Ninth, a cruel tyrant who is misshapen and insane. Among the inhabitants are the Dead Yetis, the Vrahoks, and Friftar, Gornab's right-hand man and translator who plans to overthrow the throne. General Tick-tock, a terrifying creation of metal and alchemy that leads the legendary Copper Killers, takes Rala from the abducted group of Wolpertings and uses her to perfect his machine of torture (the Metal Maiden). Rumo must fight his way across the Netherworld and back to rescue his kinsman from the horrors of Hel and save his beloved from her seemingly deadly fate.

Illustration
The book was illustrated by Walter Moers in a cartoon style.

Characters

Rumo
Rumo, full name Rumo of Zamonia, is the main protagonist of this novel.  He is a Wolperting, a species resembling anthropomorphic dogs with small horns that tend to have two varieties in terms of development.  "Civilized" Wolpertings can speak and walk on their hind legs whereas "wild" Wolpertings are more dog-like in nature, never attaining the power of speech. Both varieties are equally feared for their almost supernatural abilities in combat, both types instinctively abandon their young in the wild, and both can have the characteristics of several different breeds of dog.  Rumo has white fur and a wolf-like appearance with a v-shaped marking between his eyes.  Rumo, like all other Wolpertings, is capable of "seeing" scents by visualizing them as different colors and he has incredibly sharp hearing.  Despite his talents in fighting and incredibly fast reflexes, Rumo is perhaps the most dense Wolperting in this novel, making his attempts to win over his Silver Thread, Rala, very difficult.  He is determined but a bit quick to violence, with an unusual talent for carpentry and woodworking.  His weapon of choice is a two-pronged Demonic Sword that he got at the Weapons Tent at the city fair, though he shows slight regret at his choice in the next few days due to the constant jabbering of his talking sword.  Despite this, he forms a partner-like relationship with the two sentient beings forged into his sword, Dandelion and Krindle.

Volzotan Smyke
Volzotan Smyke is a very important character in this story as he is the one that begins Rumo's education by teaching him to speak, a vital trait of a "civilized" Wolperting.  Smyke is a Shark Grub, a primordial creature that has the head of a shark, the body of a Sulfur Grub, and fourteen arms with the ability to emit a foul-smelling slime.  We first meet Smyke on Roaming Rock where he and Rumo have been imprisoned as a food source for Demonocles, a kind one-eyed giant with a penchant for eating prey alive.  Before being imprisoned on Roaming Rock Smyke had a variety of military positions and seemingly random side jobs, including a stint as a croupier at a gambling den (an experience that served as his inspiration for Rumo's name).  By telling Rumo tales of famous battles and wars, Smyke whets Rumo's love for combat and provides exposition for some important characters that appear later on in the story.  Smyke has a very active imagination, able to isolate certain events in his past and re-live the memory of them at will.  He arranges these memories is a so-called Chamber of Memories, a hallway containing pictures of events and urns containing scents.  After utilizing Rumo to escape Roaming Rock, Smyke and Rumo meet a Nocturnomath by the name of Ostafan Kolibri, at which point Smyke undergoes an educational trip into one of Kolibri's five brains for a mental boost, learning about the death-defying instruments of the Non-Existent Teenies in the process. Much later, in the second book, Smyke ends up in the Netherworld along with Kolibri and the citizens of Wolperting and has to operate the Non-Existent Teenies' vehicles to revive Rala.

Rala
Rala, full name Rala of the Forest, was born and raised in the Great Forest.  Beaten half to death by her abusive owner and separated from her twin, Rolv of the Forest, Rala is raised by the Great Bear God Talon, who is in fact no god but simply an ordinary bear.  After Talon's death at the hands of a hunter she reunites with her long-lost brother and the two make their way to the city of Wolperting where she enrolls in school and meets Rumo.  Rala is an intelligent, proud Wolperting resembling an Afghan Hound and is the first of her kind to learn to swim, which she does rescuing Rumo from drowning.  When Rala arrives in the Netherworld, drugged and kidnapped along with her kin, she is singled out by the fearsome General Tick-tock who tortures and eventually kills her, albeit on accident.  She is later revived by Smyke, cheating death and escaping Hel with Rumo.  It is left unclear as to whether female Wolpertings see Silver Threads for their male romantic interests, but in the end it is revealed that Rala got a Painless Scar featuring Rumo's name long before she was kidnapped, showing that Rumo's love was not unrequited.

Dandelion and Krindle
Dandelion and Krindle are the two beings whose petrified brains are forged into Rumo's sword.  Dandelion was a mining Troglotroll and Krindle was a Demonic Warrior.  Dandelion is a conversational sort that is more artistically inclined whereas Krindle is violent and crude.  In their sword form they are a short, two-pronged sword with a lion on the hilt.

Rolv
Rolv, full name Rolv of the Forest, was raised in the Great Forest much like his sister, but he was not raised by the Great Bear God but rather his abusive owner.  He eventually chews through the post his is chained to and kills his owner in a fit of rage referred to as the White Fire.  Rolv is the only Wolperting in the novel that references the White Fire so it can be assumed that it is exclusive to him and not a common trait of all Wolpertings, but it appears to be a brief berserker period in which his innate talent for fighting takes complete control of his consciousness until his opponent is dead.  As such, Rolv must suppress the White Fire against opponents he doesn't want to kill.  Rolv is a stubborn, fiery Wolperting with the appearance of a Bull Terrier, very different from his twin sister, which leads to a bit of miscommunication between him and Rumo when Rumo first meets him and thinks that Rolv is in a relationship with or pursuing Rala.  He does not get along well with Rumo at all as he is very protective of his sister and has a fiery temper.  

Urs
Urs, full name Urs of the Snows, is a Wolperting that resided in Wolperting before Rumo and was assigned as Rumo's Municipal Friend (similar to a sort of orientation partner meant to teach new Wolperting citizens the ways of the city and help them along).  Urs was raised by a Vulphead duellist and became a very efficient fighter to protect his foster-father, knocking him out before duels and using his name during fights.  This attempt backfired, however, as his foster-father became famous for his skills and died fighting a duellist that easily outclassed him.  Because of this tragedy, Urs swore off swords and took up cooking. Urs later fights and kills the duellist that killed his foster-father when he is paired up against him in a twist of fate.

Ushan DeLucca
Ushan, lacking a regional indicator in his name common among Wolpertings, is an incredibly weather-sensitive and incredibly skilled Wolperting.  He holds the title of the best swordsman in Wolperting, seemingly preferring to use a rapier in his duels.  Ushan was raised by a bar owner who made him an alcoholic to keep him under control; his name, Ushan DeLucca, is the name and region of a fine rum.  Originally a criminal, he took up swordsmanship very suddenly and never touched alcohol again.  Ushan is an eccentric character with the appearance of a Bloodhound who is prone to mood swings based on barometric changes and dreams of a "perfect duel" the kinds of which have never been seen.  To realize this, he built an elaborately booby-trapped fencing garden to duel challengers in. Ushan DeLucca sacrifices himself in Hel in a valiant battle against General Tick-Tock in the Theater of Death, his sacrifice allowing Rumo enough time to destroy the mechanical monster from within.

Ornt El Okro
Ornt, an old Labrador-like Wolperting, is a cabinet-maker in the city of Wolperting renowned for his ability to give advice.  It was his advice to make a Three-Fold Token that led Rumo to venture out of the city on the ill-fated day the denizens were dragged the Hel and therefore played an instrumental role in the saving of the Wolpertings by inadvertently ensuring their savior was not captured.  Ornt was later killed by the Copper Killers after refusing to kill a puppy. 

General Tick-tock
Fearsome leader of the Copper Killers, General Tick-tock is the result of a collaboration of watchmakers, alchemists, surgeons, and blacksmiths that created him and the other Copper Killers after the Battle of Nurn Forest.  He is ruthless and fascinated with death, an interest that leads him to create the Metal Maiden as an instrument of torture that was capable of delivering toxins and medicines through its unfortunate occupant's bloodstream through thin needles studding the inside.  He uses this device on several victims before discovering what he thought to be a worthy match in Rala, unfortunately killing her in an act of passion when he discovered that she had "escaped" him by separating her consciousness from her mind.

Gornab the Ninety-ninth
Gornab is the cruel tyrant King of Hel, the ninety-ninth of his bloodline and thoroughly insane.  His bloodline is one of ill-health but sheer luck, and this particular Gornab is also afflicted with a severe speech impediment.  Interestingly enough and perhaps a facet of his insanity, Gornab cannot recognize that his speech is any different than any of the other Hellians but understands their speech just fine, seemingly insulted that the other lowborn citizens can't understand him.  Because Gornab flies into fits of rage easily in which he hears the voices of his ancestor Gornabs, his royal aide Friftar translates for him, delicately rephrasing the king's sentences as exclamations or reassurances so as to not clue the king in to the fact that he is translating what the other Hellians hear as gibberish.  Friftar is in fact leading the king along and biding his time to raise a rebellion, but dies before his dream is realized.

See Also 

 The 13½ Lives of Captain Bluebear
 The City of Dreaming Books

2003 German novels
Novels by Walter Moers
German fantasy novels